David Mitchell (born October 24, 1979) is an American mixed martial artist currently competing in the Middleweight division. A professional competitor since 2006, Mitchell has formerly competed for the UFC, the World Series of Fighting, Tachi Palace Fights, King of the Cage, and the Absolute Championship Berkut.

Background
Mitchell was born in Berkeley, California but was raised in Laytonville, California. Mitchell competed in soccer through high school and then went to several community colleges before dropping out and working in construction for six years. Mitchell began training under David Terrell at Terrell's gym in Santa Rosa, California and year later began competing in professional mixed martial arts.

Mixed martial arts career

Early career
Mitchell made his professional MMA debut in 2006 and compiled an undefeated record of 11-0 with wins over War Machine, Bobby Green, Tim McKenzie, and Poppies Martinez before being signed by the UFC. Mitchell also won the Tachi Palace Fights Welterweight Championship by defeating McKenzie and then successfully defended the title against Martinez.

Ultimate Fighting Championship
Mitchell made his UFC debut against TJ Waldburger on September 15, 2010 at UFC Fight Night: Marquardt vs. Palhares. Mitchell lost a unanimous decision (30-27, 30-27, 30-27).

Mitchell was expected to fight Mike Swick on January 22, 2011 at UFC: Fight for the Troops 2. However, Mitchell was forced out of the fight with a back injury and Swick felt as if his stomach condition was not completely healed, so the bout was scrapped from the card altogether.

Mitchell next faced Paulo Thiago on August 27, 2011 at UFC 134. Mitchell lost the fight via unanimous decision.

Mitchell was expected to face UFC newcomer Hyun Gyu Lim as a late replacement for Marcelo Guimarães on November 10, 2012 at UFC on Fuel TV 6.  However, prior to the weigh in for the event, the bout was scrapped after Lim was declared medically unfit to compete by UFC doctors.

Mitchell faced Simeon Thoresen on January 26, 2013 at UFC on Fox 6. He won the fight via unanimous decision.

Mitchell faced Mike Pierce on July 6, 2013 at UFC 162.
He lost the fight via TKO in the second round, marking the first time he's been finished in his professional career.

Mitchell faced Yan Cabral on October 9, 2013 at UFC Fight Night 29.  Cabral defeated Mitchell via unanimous decision.

Following his loss to Cabral, Mitchell was released from the UFC.

Post-UFC career
Mitchell defeated Fernando Gonzalez in a Middleweight bout via TKO on February 15, 2014 at West Coast Fighting Championship 8. The victory marked the first time Mitchell has finished an opponent via strikes.

He then faced Jaime Jara at WFC 9: Mitchell vs Jara on April 26, 2014. Mitchell won the fight via rear-naked choke submission.

Mitchell was expected to take part in a one-night tournament at BattleGrounds MMA on October 3, 2014. However, he pulled out of the tournament.

On February 28, 2015 in Sacramento, California, USA Mitchell defeated Dave Huckaba via rear-naked choke in the second round to win both the ISCF (International Sport Combat Federation) West Coast Heavyweight Title and the WFC Heavyweight Title.

Championships and accomplishments

Mixed martial arts
 Final Fight Championship
 FFC Middleweight Championship (one time, current)

Tachi Palace Fights
TPF Welterweight Championship (One time)
TPF Middleweight Championship (One time; current)
West Coast Fighting Championship
WCFC Middleweight Championship (One time; current)
WCFC Heavyweight Championship (One time; current)
International Sport Combat Federation
ISCF West Coast Heavyweight Champion (One time; current)

Mixed martial arts record

|-
|  Loss
| align=center| 22–7
| Ibragim Chuzhigaev
| TKO (punches)
| |ACB 54: Supersonic
| 
| align=center| 3
| align=center| 0:55
| Manchester, England
|
|-
|  Win
| align=center| 22–6
| Andy Manzolo
| Submission (guillotine  choke)
| FFC 27: Night of Champions
| 
| align=center| 2
| align=center| 1:30
| Zagreb, Croatia
|
|-
|  Win
| align=center| 21–6
| Richard Blake
| Submission (rear-naked choke)
| KOTC: Unchallenged
| 
| align=center| 1
| align=center| 0:48
| Oroville, California, United States
|
|-
|  Win
| align=center| 20–6
| Dervin Lopez
| Submission (rear-naked choke)
| FFC 25: Mitchell vs. Lopez
| 
| align=center| 2
| align=center| 1:09
| Springfield, Massachusetts, United States
|Return to Middleweight.
|-
|  Loss
| align=center| 19–6
| Max Griffin
| KO (punch)
| WFC 16: Griffin vs. Mitchell
| 
| align=center| 1
| align=center| 0:43
| Sacramento, California, United States
|Catchweight (175 lbs) bout.
|-
|  Loss
| align=center| 19–5
| Marcel Fortuna
| Decision (unanimous)
| Dragon House 20
| 
| align=center| 3
| align=center| 5:00
| San Francisco, California, United States
| 
|-
|  Win
| align=center| 19–4
| Dave Huckaba
| Submission (rear-naked choke)
| WCFC 13: Huckaba vs. Mitchell
| 
| align=center| 2
| align=center| 3:36
| Sacramento, California, United States
| 
|-
|  Win
| align=center| 18–4
| Angel DeAnda
| Submission (rear-naked choke)
| Tachi Palace Fights 22
| 
| align=center| 1
| align=center| 3:00
| Lemoore, California, United States
| 
|-
|  Win
| align=center| 17–4
| Justin Baesman
| Submission (rear-naked choke)
| WSOF 16
| 
| align=center| 1
| align=center| 1:44
| Sacramento, California, United States
| Return to Middleweight.
|-
|  Win
| align=center| 16–4
| Michael Gonzalez
| TKO (punches)
| WFC 12: Ricetti vs. Emmett
| 
| align=center| 1
| align=center| 3:42
| Sacramento, California, United States
| Light Heavyweight bout.
|-
|  Win
| align=center| 15–4
| Matt Major
| Submission (guillotine choke)
| WFC 11: Mitchell vs. Major
| 
| align=center| 1
| align=center| 4:47
| Sacramento, California, United States
| 
|-
|  Win
| align=center| 14–4
| Jaime Jara
| Submission (rear-naked choke)
| WFC 9: Mitchell vs. Jara
| 
| align=center| 1
| align=center| 4:15
| Sacramento, California, United States
| 
|-
|  Win
| align=center| 13–4
| Fernando Gonzalez
| TKO (punches)
| WFC 8: Avila vs. Berkovic
| 
| align=center| 3
| align=center| 1:45
| Sacramento, California, United States
| Middleweight bout.
|-
|  Loss
| align=center| 12–4
| Yan Cabral
| Decision (unanimous)
| UFC Fight Night: Maia vs. Shields
| 
| align=center| 3
| align=center| 5:00
| Barueri, São Paulo, Brazil
| 
|-
| Loss
| align=center| 12–3
| Mike Pierce
| TKO (punches)
| UFC 162
| 
| align=center| 2
| align=center| 2:55
| Las Vegas, Nevada, United States
| 
|-
| Win
| align=center| 12–2
| Simeon Thoresen
| Decision (unanimous)
| UFC on Fox: Johnson vs. Dodson
| 
| align=center| 3
| align=center| 5:00
| Chicago, Illinois, United States
| 
|-
| Loss
| align=center| 11–2
| Paulo Thiago
| Decision (unanimous)
| UFC 134
| 
| align=center| 3
| align=center| 5:00
| Rio de Janeiro, Brazil
| 
|-
| Loss
| align=center| 11–1
| TJ Waldburger
| Decision (unanimous)
| UFC Fight Night: Marquardt vs. Palhares
| 
| align=center| 3
| align=center| 5:00
| Austin, Texas, United States
| 
|-
| Win
| align=center| 11–0
| Poppies Martinez
| Technical Submission (triangle choke)
| Tachi Palace Fights 5
| 
| align=center| 1
| align=center| 1:32
| Lemoore, California, United States
| 
|-
| Win
| align=center| 10–0
| Tim McKenzie
| Submission (guillotine choke)
| Tachi Palace Fights 4
| 
| align=center| 1
| align=center| 1:10
| Lemoore, California, United States
| 
|-
| Win
| align=center| 9–0
| Bobby Green
| Submission (heel hook)
| TPF 2: Brawl in the Hall
| 
| align=center| 1
| align=center| 0:54
| Lemoore, California, United States
| 
|-
| Win
| align=center| 8–0
| War Machine
| Decision (split)
| TPF 1: Tachi Palace Fights 1
| 
| align=center| 3
| align=center| 5:00
| Lemoore, California, United States
| 
|-
| Win
| align=center| 7–0
| Josh Neal
| Submission (armbar)
| CCFC 10: Battle for NorCal
| 
| align=center| 1
| align=center| 0:28
| Santa Rosa, California, United States
| 
|-
| Win
| align=center| 6–0
| Jeff Morris
| Submission (armbar)
| CCFC: Mayhem
| 
| align=center| 1
| align=center| 1:47
| Santa Rosa, California, United States
| 
|-
| Win
| align=center| 5–0
| Andy Maccarone
| Decision (unanimous)
| CCFC: Meltdown
| 
| align=center| 3
| align=center| 5:00
| Yuba City, California, United States
| 
|-
| Win
| align=center| 4–0
| Drew Dimanlig
| Submission (armbar)
| CCFC: Total Elimination
| 
| align=center| 2
| align=center| N/A
| Santa Rosa, California, United States
| 
|-
| Win
| align=center| 3–0
| Jeff Harmon
| Submission (rear-naked choke)
| CCFC: Throwdown at the Pavilion
| 
| align=center| 2
| align=center| 1:23
| Santa Rosa, California, United States
| 
|-
| Win
| align=center| 2–0
| Kenneth Johnson
| Submission (rear-naked choke)
| Gladiator Challenge 55: Beatdown
| 
| align=center| 1
| align=center| 2:54
| Lakeport, California, United States
| 
|-
| Win
| align=center| 1–0
| John Corstorphine
| Submission (triangle choke)
| Gladiator Challenge 52: Deep Impact
| 
| align=center| 1
| align=center| 3:30
| Lakeport, California,  United States
|

See also
 List of current mixed martial arts champions
 List of male mixed martial artists

References

External links

Official UFC Profile

1979 births
Living people
American practitioners of Brazilian jiu-jitsu
Welterweight mixed martial artists
Middleweight mixed martial artists
Heavyweight mixed martial artists
Mixed martial artists utilizing Brazilian jiu-jitsu
M
Mixed martial artists from California
Sportspeople from Berkeley, California
People from Laytonville, California
Ultimate Fighting Championship male fighters